Isa is the fifth studio album by French singer Zaz, released on 22 October 2021 by Parlophone. The album takes its title from the artist's real name, Isabelle Geffroy, since its contents were more personal than her previous albums. It reached the top 10 of the album charts in five European countries.

Background and origins

After nine years of intense work following her commercial breakthrough in 2010, Zaz decided in 2019 to take a break in order to "take care of myself…I'm trying to say to myself if I want to help the world, I've got to be well." During her hiatus she became a vegetarian and got married. Although Zaz described the contents of Isa as more "personal" than her previous albums, she wrote none of the tracks herself.  Instead she communicated her feelings to a team of writers who tried to best capture them in words and music.

Reception

Isa received a mixed reception.

Although Laut.de praised the duet with Rammstein's Till Lindemann "Le jardin des larmes" as being "somehow reminiscent of a classic art song" and credits Tout là-haut for "letting Zaz's voice speak for itself", the overall conclusion is that a, "monotony of beautiful instrumentals, beautiful voice and beautiful words prevails overall. It's all nice, but also pretty boring."

Belgium's Radio 1 made Isa its album of the week on release, referring to the album's themes of "simplicity, openness and diversity" showcased by "that voice, that presence."

A positive review appeared in Le Devoir which concluded that by being both herself and her enhanced creation "Zaz chez Isa" were finally reunited and complete.

In April 2022, Le Centre de la Musique certified Isa gold for export sales outside France in 2021  and in July 2022 the album achieved gold certification for overall sales.

Promotional tour

Zaz promoted Isa performing most of its tracks during her "Organique" tour of France, Germany, UK, Spain, Switzerland, Netherlands, Belgium, Luxembourg, Hungary, Bulgaria, Poland and the Czech Republic.  The Canadian leg of the tour was cancelled since Zaz refused to comply with the country's requirement that she be vaccinated against COVID-19.

Track listing

Charts

Weekly charts

Year-end charts

References

2021 albums
French-language albums
Parlophone albums
Zaz (singer) albums